Antoinette M. Maniatty (born 1965) is an American materials scientist whose research involves the mechanical properties of materials. She has particularly studied elasticity, fatigue, and cracking in the aluminum alloys used in aircraft. She is a professor and department chair in the Department of Mechanical, Aerospace and Nuclear Engineering at the Rensselaer Polytechnic Institute.

Early life and education
Maniatty was born in 1965 in Cincinnati, and grew up in Allentown, Pennsylvania, where she went to Parkland High School. She became an undergraduate at the Rensselaer Polytechnic Institute, where she majored in mechanical engineering, graduating summa cum laude in 1987. After earning a master's degree in 1988 from the University of Minnesota, under the supervision of Nicholas Zabaras, she attended Cornell University, where she earned a second master's degree in 1990 and completed her Ph.D. in 1991. Her dissertation, Eulerian elasto-viscoplastic formulation for modeling steady-state deformations with strain-induced anisotropy, was supervised by Paul Dawson.

Career
After a year as a visiting lecturer in South Africa at the University of Natal, she returned to the Rensselaer Polytechnic Institute as Clare Boothe Luce Assistant Professor in 1992. She was promoted to associate professor in 1998 and full professor in 2005.

Recognition
Maniatty was named as an ASME Fellow in 2005.

References

External links
Home page

1965 births
Living people
People from Cincinnati
American materials scientists
Women materials scientists and engineers
Rensselaer Polytechnic Institute alumni
University of Minnesota alumni
Cornell University alumni
Rensselaer Polytechnic Institute faculty
Fellows of the American Society of Mechanical Engineers